In his letter to Manuel I of Portugal, Pero Vaz de Caminha gives what is considered by many today as being one of the most accurate accounts of what Brazil used to look like in 1500. "[...] Esse arvoredo, que é tanto, tamanho, tão basto e de tantas prumagens, que homens as não podem contar.", which roughly translates as "Such vastness of the enormous treeline, with abundant foliage, that is incalculable", is one of Pero's  most famous descriptions. He describes in a diary from the first journey from Portugal to Brazil and their arrival in this country. This letter is considered to be the first document of Brazilian history as much as its first literary text. The original of this 27-page document can be found in the Arquivo Nacional da Torre do Tombo, Lisbon.

Context 
Manuel I ascended the throne at a time when Portugal was discovering wealth in Africa and the East; he was keen on ensuring Portugal maintained dominance in trade with the East. Portugal has established their presence with enclaves, forts and fortified trading posts.

Pedro Álvares Cabral led the largest fleet in Portuguese fleet on a mission to Calicut, India where Vasco da Gama has opened a sea route to two years prior. Many historians have debated on the authenticity of this discovery; some have reason to believe that Portugal had prior knowledge of Brazil's existence. Pero Vaz de Caminha was the secretary of this fleet;  he had been appointed to be the administrator of a trading post to be created in Calicut. Once Cabral had gathered basic facts and had encountered the native people, he took this information and Caminha's letter on a smaller ship back to Lisbon.

Contents

General description of the native people

Comments on the native women, comparing them to European women

Other 
The admiral of the ship that sailed to Brazil sent Nicolau Coelho out to interact with the natives. The people they encountered when they arrived in Brazil lived by a mix of hunting-gathering and agriculture. They were brown and reddish-skinned and completely unclothed. Their languages were divided into four major families with many isolates, and even related languages and dialects were likely to not be mutually intelligible, so they had to communicate through actions and sign languages. They tried to give the natives things to eat such as bread, fish, cakes, honey and even wine. The natives took one taste of the things then spit them all out. They also tried to give them just water but the natives only swashed the water in their mouths, then spit it out. The one thing they did consent to was a cloak they could use to cover themselves while they slept.

Analysis 
Apart from being the first ever literary description of Brazil, what sets Caminha's letter apart from other documents like it was his style of writing. Whilst writing this letter, Caminha was not trying to create a literary work but trying to report exactly what he found; it was a detailed commentary on the "customs, religion and physical characteristics of native people." It is devoid of hyperbole and does not use excessive metaphors to validate descriptions. He states things for what they are, not for what he thinks they represent.  Other early accounts of the New World emphasized on the idea of prosperity and use adjectives and hyperbole to describe the quantity and quality of its bounty. There is a general tone of optimism that Brazil will provide both spiritual and material gifts. He emphasizes on the "simplicity and good nature" of the indigenous people.

Caminha's Opinions 
Caminha did not describe the native Brazilians as bestial and lesser-humans as is common with other early Brazilian narratives. He does not describe them as more or less attractive than they were and seems to be particularly enthralled by their nudity and body paints. He shows "sentiments of admiration, enchantment and protectionism." He believes that they are part of God's creation; he is respectful and understanding them that is why he calls for syncretism instead of enslavement. During the first mass, the native Brazilians responded favorably and thus, to Caminha, are worth saving because "they have no apparent trace of spiritual corruption." There is the assumption that it will be easy to convert indigenous people to Christianity.

References

External links 
  A Carta de Pero Vaz de Caminha
  A Carta de Pero Vaz de Caminha
 Excerpts from the Letter of Pero Vaz de Caminha

16th century in Brazil
Brazilian literature
Memory of the World Register
Portuguese colonization of the Americas
Portuguese literature